Khanehhay-e Asiab (also Romanized as Khānehhāy-e Āsīāb; also known as Khānehhā-ye Āsīāb) is a village in Virmuni Rural District, in the Central District of Astara County, Gilan Province, Iran. At the 2006 census, its population was 803, in 190 families.

Language 
Linguistic composition of the village.

References 

Populated places in Astara County